Fourraea alpina is a species of flowering plant in the family Brassicaceae, and the only member of the genus Fourraea. It is native to Europe, where its range extends from Spain in the west to Croatia in the east, and from Belgium and Czechia in the north to Italy in the south.

Its synonyms include:
Arabis brassica 
 Arabis brassiciformis 
 Arabis pauciflora 
  Brassica alpina 
 Caulopsis alpina 
 Caulopsis pauciflora 
 Conringia alpina 
 Turritis brassica 
 Turritis pauciflora 

It has a diploid chromosome number of 2n=14.

Gallery

References

External links 

Brassicaceae